Moxi may refer to:

Moxi (DVR), digital video recorders
Mo Xi, consort of Jie, the last ruler of the legendary Xia dynasty
Moxi, Luding County, Sichuan, China
Moxi, Suining, Anju District, a township-level division of Sichuan, China
Moxi Township, De'an County, a township-level division of Jiangxi, China

See also
Moxie (disambiguation)
Moxy (disambiguation)